The superposition theorem is a derived result of the superposition principle suited to the network analysis of electrical circuits. The superposition theorem states that for a linear system (notably including the subcategory of time-invariant linear systems) the response (voltage or current) in any branch of a bilateral linear circuit having more than one independent source equals the algebraic sum of the responses caused by each independent source acting alone, where all the other independent sources are replaced by their internal impedances.

To ascertain the contribution of each individual source, all of the other sources first must be "turned off" (set to zero) by:
 Replacing all other independent voltage sources with a short circuit (thereby eliminating difference of potential i.e. V=0; internal impedance of ideal voltage source is zero (short circuit)).
 Replacing all other independent current sources with an open circuit (thereby eliminating current i.e. I=0; internal impedance of ideal current source is infinite (open circuit)).
This procedure is followed for each source in turn, then the resultant responses are added to determine the true operation of the circuit. The resultant circuit operation is the superposition of the various voltage and current sources.

The superposition theorem is very important in circuit analysis. It is used in converting any circuit into its Norton equivalent or Thevenin equivalent.

The theorem is applicable to linear networks (time varying or time invariant) consisting of independent sources, linear dependent sources, linear passive elements (resistors, inductors, capacitors) and linear transformers.

Superposition works for voltage and current but not power. In other words, the sum of the powers of each source with the other sources turned off is not the real consumed power. To calculate power we first use superposition to find both current and voltage of each linear element and then calculate the sum of the multiplied voltages and currents.

However, if the linear network is operating in steady-state and each external independent source has a different frequency, then superposition can be applied to compute the average power or active power. If at least two independent sources have the same frequency (for example in power systems, where many generators operate at 50 Hz or 60 Hz), then superposition can't be used to determine average power.

Gas pressure analogy
The electric circuit superposition theorem is analogous to Dalton's law of partial pressure which can be stated as the total pressure exerted by an ideal gas mixture in a given volume is the algebraic sum of all the pressures exerted by each gas if it were alone in that volume.

References

 Electronic Devices and Circuit Theory (9th ed.) by Boylestad and Nashelsky
 Basic Circuit Theory by C. A. Desoer and E. H. Kuh
 ''Edward Hughes revised by John.K, Keith.B etal (2008) Electrical and Electronic Technology (10th ed.) Pearson  page 75-77

External links
On the Application of Superposition to Dependent Sources in Circuit Analysis – proves superposition of dependent sources is valid.
Circuit theorems

de:Superposition (Physik)#Elektrotechnik